Chester Road can mean:
Part of the A183 road from South Shields to Chester-le-Street
The A452 road in England. It runs from Leamington Spa, Warwickshire to Brownhills in Staffordshire, following the line of the ancient drover's road called the Welsh Road
The main road out of Manchester towards Chester, making up part of the A56
Chester Road North Ground, a cricket ground in Kidderminster
Chester Road railway station, on the Redditch-Birmingham New Street-Lichfield Cross-City Line in the West Midlands
A residential street in the Whitehall area of Bristol